Robert Lindner (19 June 1916 – 6 June 1967) was an Austrian actor.

Selected filmography
 Schrammeln (1944)
 The Other Life (1948)
 Third from the Right (1950)
 Daughter of the Regiment (1953)
 Between Time and Eternity (1956)

References

Bibliography
 Goble, Alan. The Complete Index to Literary Sources in Film. Walter de Gruyter, 1999.

External links

1916 births
1967 deaths
Austrian male film actors
Male actors from Vienna